The year 2016 in Japanese music.

Events
67th NHK Kōhaku Uta Gassen

Number-ones
Oricon number-one albums
Oricon number-one singles
Hot 100 number-one singles

Best-sellers

Artists
The following is a list of the 5 best-selling music artists in Japan in 2016 by value of sales, including sales of records and of DVDs and Blu-rays, according to Oricon.

Albums
The following is a list of the top 10 best-selling albums in Japan in 2016, according to Oricon.

Singles

Oricon
The following is a list of the top 10 best-selling singles in Japan in 2016, according to Oricon.

Billboard Japan
The following is a list of the top 10 best-selling singles in Japan in 2016, according to Billboard Japan's year-end Top Singles Sales chart.

Awards
58th Japan Record Awards
2016 MTV Video Music Awards Japan

Albums released

January

February

March

April

May

June

July

August

September

October

November

December

Debuting

Debuting groups
3B junior
Batten Girls
B.I.G
Bis
Chai
Chelmico
CLC
CocoSori
DYGL
FEMM
FlowBack
Gang Parade
Hiragana Keyakizaka46
Hotshot
iKon
Keyakizaka46
Musubizm
OnePixcel
Poppin'Party
Pyxis
Reol
Rock A Japonica
ShuuKaRen
Tempalay
The Sixth Lie
The World Standard
Yahyel
Zenbu Kimi no Sei da.

Debuting soloists
Aina Aiba
Asaka
Ayaka Sasaki
Kanna Hashimoto
Kyuhyun
Manami Numakura
Miku Itō
Momo Asakura
Momoka Ariyasu
Mone Kamishiraishi
Reina Ueda
Rie Murakawa
Taichi Mukai
Uru

Deaths
February 10 – Asami Nagakiya, 30, Japanese steel pan player (suspected murder)
April 3 – Kōji Wada, 42, Japanese singer and songwriter (pharyngeal cancer)

See also
 2016 in Japan
 2016 in Japanese television
 List of Japanese films of 2016

References